The Central District of Chalus County is a district (bakhsh) in Chalus County, Mazandaran Province, Iran. At the 2006 census, its population was 83,101, in 23,101 families.  The district has two cities: Chalus and Hachirud. The district has two rural districts (dehestan): Kelarestaq-e Gharbi Rural District and Kelarestaq-e Sharqi Rural District.

References 

Chalus County
Districts of Mazandaran Province